Krishnendu Narayan Choudhury is an Indian advocate and politician currently serves as Chairman of English Bazar Municipality.He has served as the Cabinet Minister of Tourism and Minister of Food processing and Horticulture from West Bengal.He was former MLA from English Bazar and State General Secretary of All India Trinamool Congress.

Introduction
Krishnendu Narayan Choudhury, son of Manindra Narayan Choudhury, was born in 1958 in a well known jamindar family of Malda District . He is BA and LLB from Calcutta University.

Political forays
He started his political journey in 1974 with Congress.After several year in INC he left Congress in 1998 and joined Trinamool Congress, but returned to Congress in 2006. He subsequently rejoined Trinamool Congress in 2013.

Electoral achievements
He had won the English Bazar seat in 2006 and 2011 as a Congress candidate. After switching over to Trinamool Congress the second time, he won a by-election in 2013 from the same constituency.

Ministerial berths
He initially joined the Council of Ministers of West Bengal as tourism minister in 2013 and was shifted to food processing and horticulture department in 2014.

He was also Chairman of English Bazar municipality for several year in subsequent term in 1995,2000,2010 and 2015

References

1958 births
Living people
West Bengal MLAs 2006–2011
West Bengal MLAs 2011–2016
People from Malda district
Trinamool Congress politicians from West Bengal
State cabinet ministers of West Bengal
Indian National Congress politicians from West Bengal